Tobelo is a North Halmahera language spoken on the eastern Indonesian island of Halmahera and on parts of several neighboring islands. The Tobelo-speaking heartland is in the six administrative districts of Tobelo, located on the western shore of Kao Bay and forming the central part of Halmahera Utara Regency. Other Tobelo-speaking areas are the five districts of Wasile (the northwestern half of Halmahera Timur Regency) on the southern and eastern shores of Kao Bay, and the northern half of Morotai Island. The district capital, also known as Tobelo, serves as a regional commercial and administrative center and is the largest settlement on Halmahera.

Dialects
Six principal dialects are generally recognized (Voorhoeve 1988):

Heleworuru
Boeng
Dodinga
Lake Paca
Kukumutuk
Popon

The last three dialects are also known as "Tugutil". The Tugutil or "Forest Tobelo" varieties may include additional dialectal variants, but this has not been satisfactorily documented (Voorhoeve 1988). Intelligibility is not great (Ethnologue).

In addition, based on cognition percentages in a basic vocabulary list, Voorhoeve 1988 identifies five other North Halmaheran language varieties as dialects of the putative Northeast Halmaheran language. Together with Tobelo, these varieties are Galela, Loloda, Modole, Pagu and Tabaru. Most speakers consider these to be distinct languages from Tobelo, although they do acknowledge a certain degree of mutual intelligibility.

Phonology

Consonants 

Consonant sounds in parentheses only occur in loan words or in other Tobelo dialects.

Vowels 

Mid front vowels can range from /e/ to /ɛ/.

Directionals
Most all of the 50 languages of Maluku have some sort of directional system. At the least the up/down distinction seems to be an areal feature. But this brings up the chicken and the egg phenomenon.  
Is this directional system of AN or NAN origin?  Or is it a mixture?

Perhaps it is not a coincidence that the Tobelo are the most widespread ethnic group in Maluku, with sizable emigrant population throughout the province. We can a least be sure that the Malay directionals are the "egg", 
because Malay as spoken in Western Indonesia does not use these directionals whereas Moluccan Malay uses direct calques of the Tobelo terms:

bawah, atas, darat, laut.

Tobelo directionals are described in Taylor (1984). 
Tobelo directional adverbs occur:

on motion verbs to specify direction of motion
on nouns to specify motion away from or toward an object

Thus, interpretation of directional adverbs is entirely context-dependent. For example,

If I meet you landwards of the house, this means that I'm headed inland from my house.  
If I meet you seawards of the house, then it means I'm headed inland to the house.

References

External links 
 Tobelo Bible App

Further reading
Holton, Gary. 2003. Tobelo. (Languages of the World/Materials 328). Munich: LINCOM Europa. 
Hueting, Anton. 1908. Tobeloreesch-Hollandsch woordenboek met Hollandsch-Tobeloreesch inhoudsopgave. 's-Gravenhage: Nijhoff.
Hueting, Anton. 1908. O Tobelohoka manga totoade: verhalen en vertellingen in de Tobeloreesche taal. Bijdragen tot de Taal-, Land- en Volkenkunde van Nederlandsch-Indië 61.1-318.  
Hueting, Anton. 1936. Iets over de spaakkunst van de Tobeloreesche taal. Bijdragen tot de Taal-, Land- en Volkenkunde van Nederlandsch-Indië 94.295-407.  
Taylor, Paul Michael. 1984. Tobelorese deixis. Anthropological Linguistics 26.102-22.

Voorhoeve, C. L. 1988. The languages of the northern Halmaheran stock. Papers in New Guinea Linguistics, no. 26., 181-209. (Pacific Linguistics A-76). Canberra: Australian National University.

Languages of Indonesia

North Halmahera languages